The Royal Melbourne Hospital (RMH), located in Parkville, Victoria, an inner suburb of Melbourne, is one of Australia's leading public hospitals. It is a major teaching hospital for tertiary health care with a reputation in clinical research. The hospital is managed as part of Melbourne Health which comprises the Royal Melbourne Hospital, North West Dialysis Service and North Western Mental Health. The Melbourne Health Chief Executive is Christine Kilpatrick AO.

History

Established in 1848 as the Melbourne Hospital, it was one of Melbourne's leading hospitals. Originally located on the corner of Swanston and Lonsdale Streets, Melbourne in 1935 the hospital was renamed the Royal Melbourne Hospital and, in 1944, it moved to Grattan Street, Parkville by provision of lands in the Royal Melbourne Hospital Act. The old buildings then became home to the Queen Victoria Hospital.

The Royal Women's Hospital was previously located in Carlton. The hospital moved in late 2008 to a new building, the new Royal Women's Hospital, co-located on the Royal Melbourne Hospital site in Parkville.

World War II
During World War II, the Parkville hospital, which was under construction, was occupied by the United States Army 4th General Hospital between 1942 and 1944. While the hospital was under construction a temporary tent hospital was set up by the US Army in Royal Park just north of the hospital. Upon completion of the Parkville hospital the patients were moved progressively into the new accommodation which catered for 2,900 beds.

The Royal Melbourne Hospital continued to operate from their old premises on the corner of Lonsdale and Swanston Streets until the 4th General Hospital moved to Finschhaven in New Guinea in 1944. The Parkville buildings were reconditioned and the Royal Melbourne Hospital finally moved into their "new" premises in December 1944.

Services and specialties provided
The Royal Melbourne Hospital provides acute tertiary referral services at its main site on Grattan Street between Flemington Road and Royal Parade and ancillary services such as aged care, rehabilitation, ambulatory care and residential and community services through its Royal Park site.

It has one of the largest Emergency Departments in Victoria and is, with the Alfred Hospital, one of Victoria's two major trauma referral centres. The emergency facilities include: 2 trauma bays, 7 resuscitation cubicles, 25 general cubical beds and 17 short-stay beds. There is also a helipad on top of the hospital so that urgent cases that need to be airlifted from regional areas can be transferred to the Royal Melbourne.

Most medical and surgical specialties are available at the Royal Melbourne Hospital. It is one of very few public hospitals in the Australasia that routinely performs robotic surgery. In addition, the Victoria Infectious Diseases Service (VIDS) is based in the hospital, as is the John Cade Psychiatry Ward and the headquarters of the North Western Mental Health service.

Medical specialties

 General Medicine: Ward 5 South-West and 5 South-East
 Respiratory Medicine: Ward 5 South-West
 Gastroenterology: Ward 5 North
 Cardiology/Coronary Care Unit: CCU 2B
 Endocrinology: 6 South West
 Rheumatology
 Dermatology
 Renal Medicine: 6 West and 6 South-West
 Neurology: 8B
 Acute Stroke Service: Ward 8B
 Haematology and Bone Marrow Transplant: Ward 7B
 VIDS/Infectious Diseases: 9 East
 Intensive Care Unit: 6B
 Palliative Care: 7 West

Surgical specialties
 General Surgery: 3 South West, 3 South
 Colorectal Surgery: 3 South West, 3 South
 Hepato-biliary and Pancreatic Surgery: 3 South West
 Transplant Surgery
 Trauma: 7 South East, 7 South West
 Cardiothoracic Surgery: 6 South-East
 Urology: 9 West
 Oral and Maxillofacial Surgery: 7 South East
 Vascular Surgery: 9 West
 Plastic Surgery: 7 South East
 Orthopaedics: 7 South West
 Neurosurgery: 4 South
 Ophthalmology: 9 West

Mental health services
 Department of Psychiatry: 1 North
 Psychiatric Ward: John Cade Building
 North Western Mental Health
 Inner West Mental Health Service

Miscellaneous
 Radiology 
 Pathology
 Emergency department

In addition, the Royal Melbourne Hospital has an Enhanced Crisis Assessment & Treatment Team & Triage Service (ECATT) team on call 24 hours a day to assess patients in the Emergency Department.

Postgraduate training, the clinical school and nursing education
The clinical school at Royal Melbourne Hospital is one of the clinical schools of the University of Melbourne School of Medicine (the others being based at the St Vincent's Hospital, the Austin Hospital, Shepparton Regional Hospital, Northern Hospital, Western Hospital, Ballarat Hospital, Bendigo Hospital, and Northeast Health Wangaratta).

The hospital offers postgraduate educational activities, including weekly professorial case discussion meeting, grand round, daily morning registrars teaching round, intern training sessions, advanced life support forums, and other individual department-based educational sessions.

The new residents' quarter is located on the 8th floor.

The Royal Melbourne Nursing Education Department provides continuing professional education opportunities for nurses. It offers programs for undergraduates, graduate nurses and postgraduate students as well as short courses, staff development and mandatory resuscitation training. It also offers some online training modules.

The programs focus on recruitment and retention of nurses.

Fellowship positions
In addition to post graduate training, largely aimed at Australian trainees, the Royal Melbourne Hospital also offers clinical and research fellowship positions, most of which are open to both Australian and international candidates.

Fellowships available include:
 Colorectal Surgery (including advanced minimally invasive surgery)
 Urology (including robotic surgery)
 Diagnostic and Interventional Radiology
 Arthroplasty and Pelvic Trauma Surgery

Research and other medical and academic collaborations
The hospital undertakes clinical research in oncology, neurosciences, infectious diseases, diabetes colorectal cancer and mental health.

In addition, there are close ties with:
 The Walter and Eliza Hall Institute of Medical Research (WEHI)
 Cancer Trials Australia
 The Howard Florey Institute at the University of Melbourne
 Mental Health Research Institute of Victoria
 National Ageing Research Institute
 Ludwig Institute for Cancer Research

Notable personnel
 Jean Evelyn Headberry - Dean of Royal Melbourne and Associated Hospital's School of Nursing

See also 
 List of hospitals
 List of hospitals in Australia

References

External links 

 

Hospitals established in 1848
Hospitals in Melbourne
Hospital buildings completed in 1944
Melbourne Hospital, Royal
1848 establishments in Australia
Teaching hospitals in Australia
Buildings and structures in the City of Melbourne (LGA)